Luke Parker may refer to:

 Luke Parker (cricketer) (born 1983), English cricketer
 Luke Parker (footballer) (born 1992), Australian rules footballer
 Luke Parker (cyclist) (born 1993), Australian cyclist
 Luke Parker, contestant on The Bachelorette (American season 15)